Eyre Creek may refer to:

 Eyre Creek (Lake Eyre basin), part of the Lake Eyre basin and located in Queensland and South Australia
 Eyre Creek (New Zealand)
 Eyre Creek (locality), New Zealand
Eyre Creek (Ontario), a tributary of Redstone River (Haliburton County, Ontario)
 Eyre Creek (South Australia), a tributary of the Wakefield River

See also
 Eyre River (disambiguation)
 Lake Eyre (disambiguation)